Hypena atomaria, the speckled snout moth, is a species of moth in the family Erebidae.

The MONA or Hodges number for Hypena atomaria is 8450.

References

Further reading

 
 
 

atomaria
Articles created by Qbugbot
Moths described in 1903